Richard Kevan Gosper, AO (born 19 December 1933) is an Australian former athlete who mainly competed in the 400 metres. He was formerly a Vice President of the International Olympic Committee, and combined Chairman and CEO of Shell Australia.

1956 Summer Olympics
Gosper competed for Australia in the 1956 Summer Olympics held in Melbourne, Australia, where he won the silver medal in the 4 × 400 metre relay with his teammates Graham Gipson, Leon Gregory and David Lean.

International Olympic Committee
Gosper was nominated to the International Olympic Committee in 1977; was a vice president of the Sydney Organising Committee for the Olympic Games (SOCOG). He was chief of the IOC Press Commission, deputy chairman of the IOC Co-ordination Commission for the Beijing 2008 Olympic Games, chairman of Olympic Games Knowledge Services and president of the Oceania National Olympic Committees. He was inaugural chairman of the Australian Institute of Sport 1980–85, and president of the Australian Olympic Committee 1985–1990 and continues to serve on its executive board.

From 1980 to 1993 Gosper was chairman and chief executive of Shell Australia in Melbourne, and later head of Shell Asia Pacific operations out of London. The other positions he has held include being chief commissioner of the City of Melbourne and chairman of the National Australia Day Council. He was a director of a number of Australian companies, including Crown Resorts, Visy and Lion Nathan.

His autobiography, An Olympic Life, was published in March 2000.

In May 2000, Gosper was criticized after his daughter Sophie was made the first Australian torchbearer in a late change over the previously selected Greek-Australian Yianna Souleles. At age 11, Sophie Gosper was too young by one year to carry the torch in Australia, but was invited by the Hellenic Olympic Committee to be the second carrier of the Olympic flame in Greece. Gosper apologized days later due to public outrage, though he insisted he was not involved in the decision.

He was accused of being an "apologist for dictators" after his criticism of pro-democracy protesters during the Beijing 2008 torch relay. He suggested that during the Olympic Torch Australian appearance Chinese para-military torch attendants could be called into action if Australian police were unable to cope with potential protests. His remarks prompted a swift rebuke from Australian Attorney-General Robert McClelland.

Honours
Gosper was appointed an Officer of the Order of Australia (AO) in the 1986 Australia Day Honours for service to sport and sports administration, and was inducted into the Sport Australia Hall of Fame in 1989. He received an Australian Sports Medal in 2000 for services to athletics and the Olympic movement, and has been similarly honoured by France, The Netherlands, Spain, Monaco and Senegal and Solomon Islands.

Notes

1933 births
Living people
Australian male sprinters
Australian Olympic Committee administrators
Australian International Olympic Committee members
Australian sports executives and administrators
Olympic silver medalists for Australia
Athletes (track and field) at the 1956 Summer Olympics
Olympic athletes of Australia
International Olympic Committee members
People educated at Newcastle Boys' High School
Officers of the Order of Australia
Recipients of the Australian Sports Medal
Sport Australia Hall of Fame inductees
Athletes (track and field) at the 1960 Summer Olympics
Medalists at the 1956 Summer Olympics
Olympic silver medalists in athletics (track and field)
Athletes (track and field) at the 1954 British Empire and Commonwealth Games
Athletes (track and field) at the 1958 British Empire and Commonwealth Games
Commonwealth Games medallists in athletics
Commonwealth Games gold medallists for Australia
Commonwealth Games bronze medallists for Australia
Shell plc people
Medallists at the 1954 British Empire and Commonwealth Games
Medallists at the 1958 British Empire and Commonwealth Games